A flight deck is the platform of an aircraft carrier used for takeoffs and landings. 

Flight deck may also refer to:
 An aircraft's cockpit

Roller coasters
 Flight Deck (Canada's Wonderland), in Vaughan, Ontario
 Flight Deck (California's Great America), United States
 Flight Deck (Kings Island), former name for The Bat roller coaster, Mason, Ohio, United States

See also